LFS may stand for:

Organizations
 Libertarian Futurist Society, annually presents the Prometheus award for best libertarian Science Fiction
 Lutheran Family Services of Virginia, a non-profit human services organization
 Lincoln Financial Sports, a sports production company
 London Free School, a couterculture/hippie collective that organised the first Notting Hill Carnival
 Lundy Field Society, a charity supporting the study and conservation of history, natural history and archaeology on the island of Lundy

Schools
 London Film School, a graduate film school in the United Kingdom
 Lokhandwala Foundation School, a private school in Mumbai, India
 French School of Seoul
 
 French School of Singapore

Computing
 Live for Speed, a 2003 computer racing simulator
 Linux From Scratch, a kit for building Linux distributions
 Large File Summit, an industry initiative to form large file support
 Large-file support, support for files larger than 2 GiB
 Git Large File Storage, an extension for the Git version control system
 Live File System, Microsoft's implementation of Universal Disk Format (UDF) 2.5 in Windows Vista
 Log File System, Microsoft's NTFS log of file metadata pending commit
 Log-structured File System (BSD), a log-structured file system for NetBSD
 Logic File System, a research file system that uses propositional logic for querying and navigating files

Other
 Luiz Felipe Scolari (born 1948), Brazilian football manager
 Nova Bus LF Series or Nova LFS, a bus manufactured by Nova Bus used mainly for public transit
 Labour Force Survey, a household survey of employment statistics conducted in all European Union countries as well as Canada, Australia and New Zealand
 Li–Fraumeni syndrome
 Laminar Flame speed